Hello, Dolly! is a 1969 American musical romantic comedy film based on the 1964 Broadway production of the same name, which was based on Thornton Wilder's play The Matchmaker. Directed by Gene Kelly and written and produced by Ernest Lehman, the film stars Barbra Streisand, Walter Matthau, Michael Crawford, Danny Lockin, Tommy Tune, Fritz Feld, Marianne McAndrew, E. J. Peaker and Louis Armstrong (whose recording of the title tune had become a number-one single in May 1964). The film follows the story of Dolly Levi, a strong-willed matchmaker who travels to Yonkers, New York in order to find a match for the miserly "well-known unmarried half-a-millionaire" Horace Vandergelder. In doing so, she convinces his niece, his niece's intended and Horace's two clerks to travel to New York.

Released on December 16, 1969, by 20th Century Fox, the film won three Academy Awards for Best Art Direction, Best Score of a Musical Picture and Best Sound and was nominated for a further four Academy Awards, including Best Picture. Although the film eventually broke even, it was not a commercial success.

Plot
In 1890, all of New York City is excited because the well-known widowed matchmaker Dolly Levi is in town. Dolly is currently seeking a wife for grumpy Horace Vandergelder, the well-known "half-a-millionaire", but it soon becomes clear that she intends to marry Horace herself. Meanwhile, Ambrose Kemper, a young artist, wants to marry Horace's niece, Ermengarde. However, Horace opposes this, feeling Ambrose cannot provide financial security. Horace, who is the owner of Vandergelder's Hay and Feed, explains to his two clerks, Cornelius Hackl and Barnaby Tucker, that he is going to get married, though what he really wants is a housekeeper. He plans to travel to New York that very day to march in the 14th Street Parade, and also to propose to milliner Irene Molloy, whom he has met through Dolly Levi. Dolly arrives in Yonkers and sends Horace ahead to the city. Before leaving, he tells Cornelius and Barnaby to mind the store.

Cornelius, weary of his dull existence, decides that he and Barnaby need to get out of Yonkers. Dolly overhears, and decides to set them up with Irene Molloy and her shop assistant, Minnie Fay. She also helps Ambrose and Ermengarde, entering them in a dance contest at the very fancy Harmonia Gardens restaurant, which Dolly and her late husband frequented. The entire company takes the train to New York.

In New York, Irene and Minnie open their hat shop for the afternoon. Irene does not love Horace Vandergelder, but knows that the marriage will provide her with financial security and an escape from her boring job. However, Irene hopes to escape her loveless marriage, and plans to try and find real love before the summer is over. Cornelius and Barnaby arrive at the shop and pretend to be rich- Irene seems to take to Cornelius immediately. Horace and Dolly arrive, and Cornelius and Barnaby hide. Minnie screams when she finds Cornelius hiding in an armoire. Horace is about to open the armoire himself, but Dolly "searches" it and pronounces it empty. After hearing Cornelius sneeze, Horace storms out upon realizing there are men hiding in the shop, although he is unaware that they are his clerks. Dolly arranges for Cornelius and Barnaby, who are still pretending to be rich, to take the ladies out to dinner at Harmonia Gardens to make up for their humiliation. Dolly briefly tries to teach Cornelius and Barnaby to dance, which leads to the whole town dancing in the local park.

The clerks and the ladies go to watch the Fourteenth Street Association Parade together. Alone, Dolly asks her first husband Ephram's permission to marry Horace, requesting a sign. She resolves to move on with life. After meeting an old friend, Gussie Granger, on a float in the parade, Dolly catches up with the annoyed Vandergelder as he is marching in the parade. She tells him the heiress Ernestina Simple would be perfect for him and asks him to meet her at Harmonia Gardens that evening.

Cornelius is determined to get a kiss before the night is over. Since the clerks have no money to hire a carriage, they tell the girls that walking to the restaurant is more stylish. In a quiet flat, Dolly prepares for the evening. At the Harmonia Gardens Restaurant, Rudolph, the head waiter, whips his crew into shape for Dolly Levi's return. Horace arrives to meet his date, who is really Dolly's friend Gussie. As it turns out, she is not rich or elegant as Dolly implied, and she soon leaves after being bored by Horace, just as she and Dolly planned.

Cornelius, Barnaby and their dates arrive and are unaware that Horace is also at the restaurant. Dolly makes her triumphant return to the restaurant and is greeted in style by the staff. She sits in the now-empty seat at Horace's table and proceeds to tell him that no matter what he says, she will not marry him. Fearful of being caught, Cornelius confesses to the ladies that he and Barnaby have no money, and Irene, who knew they were pretending all along, offers to pay for the meal. She then realizes that she left her handbag with all her money in it at home. The four try to sneak out during the polka contest, but Horace recognizes them and also spots Ermengarde and Ambrose. In the ensuing confrontation, Vandergelder fires Cornelius and Barnaby, and they are forced to flee as a riot breaks out. Cornelius professes his love for Irene. Horace declares that he would not marry Dolly if she were the last woman in the world. Dolly angrily bids him farewell; while he's bored and lonely, she will be living the high life.

The next morning, back at the hay and feed store, Cornelius and Irene, Barnaby and Minnie, and Ambrose and Ermengarde each come to collect the money Vandergelder owes them. Chastened, he finally admits that he needs Dolly in his life, but she is unsure about the marriage until Ephram sends her a sign. Cornelius becomes Horace's business partner at the store, and Barnaby fills Cornelius' old position. Horace tells Dolly life would be dull without her, and she promises that she will "never go away again".

Cast

 Barbra Streisand as Dolly Levi
 Walter Matthau as Horace Vandergelder
 Michael Crawford as Cornelius Hackl
 Marianne McAndrew as Irene Molloy
 E. J. Peaker as Minnie Fay
 Danny Lockin as Barnaby Tucker
 Joyce Ames as Ermengarde Vandergelder
 Tommy Tune as Ambrose Kemper
 Judy Knaiz as Gussie Granger; Ernestina Semple
 David Hurst as Rudolph Reisenweber
 Fritz Feld as Fritz, German waiter
 Richard Collier as Joe, Vandergelder's barber
 J. Pat O'Malley as Policeman in park
 Louis Armstrong as Orchestra leader
 Scatman Crothers as Porter (uncredited)
 Tucker Smith (uncredited) as Dancer
 Jennifer Gan (uncredited) as Miss Bolivia

Musical numbers

 "Call On Dolly"
 "Just Leave Everything To Me"
 "Main Titles (Overture)"
 "It Takes a Woman"
 "It Takes a Woman (Reprise)"
 "Put on Your Sunday Clothes"
 "Ribbons Down My Back"
 "Dancing"
 "Before the Parade Passes By"
 "Intermission"
 "Elegance"
 "Love is Only Love"
 "Hello, Dolly!"
 "It Only Takes a Moment"
 "So Long, Dearie"
 "Finale"
 "End Credits"

The soundtrack was released on the vinyl LP format and 8-track tape format in December 1969. It was released on compact disc in November 1994. Both the LP and compact disc omit selections 1, 3, 10, and 17.

Production

Filming

The town of Garrison, New York, specifically the Garrison Landing Historic District around the train station, was the filming site for scenes in Yonkers.  In the opening credits, the passenger train is traveling along the Hudson River. Provided by the Strasburg Rail Road, the train is pulled by Pennsylvania Railroad 1223 (now located in the Railroad Museum of Pennsylvania) retrofitted to resemble a New York Central & Hudson River locomotive. The locomotive, used in "Put on Your Sunday Clothes", was restored specifically for the film. The Poughkeepsie (Metro-North station) trackside platform was used at the beginning when Dolly was on her way to Yonkers.

The name of Judy Knaiz's character, Ernestina Semple, was changed from the stage version's Ernestina Money.

The church scene was filmed on the grounds of the United States Military Academy at West Point, New York, but the church's facade was constructed only for the film. New York City scenes were filmed on the 20th Century-Fox lot in California. Some of the exteriors still exist. The film was photographed in 65 mm Todd-AO by Harry Stradling.

The film was beset by tension on the set, with Streisand clashing with costar Matthau and director Kelly. Michael Kidd, the choreographer, had conflicts with costume designer Irene Sharaff and Kelly, to the point that he and Kelly were no longer on speaking terms. Tensions came to a head in a heated argument between Streisand and Matthau on June 6, 1968, on a hot day in Garrison the day after the assassination of Robert F. Kennedy.

Music
Most of the original Broadway production's score was preserved for the film; however, "Just Leave Everything to Me" and "Love Is Only Love" were not in the stage show. Jerry Herman wrote "Just Leave Everything to Me" especially for Streisand; it effectively replaced "I Put My Hand In" from the Broadway production. However, an instrumental version of parts of "I Put My Hand In" can be heard in the film during the dance competition at the Harmonia Gardens. Herman had previously written "Love is Only Love" for the stage version of Mame, but it was cut before its Broadway premiere. It occurred in the story as Mame tried to explain falling in love to her young nephew, Patrick. A brief prologue of "Mrs. Horace Vandergelder" was added to the song to integrate it into this film.

Working under the musical direction of Lionel Newman and Lennie Hayton, the very large team of orchestrators included film stalwarts Herbert W. Spencer and Alexander Courage; the original Broadway production arranger, Philip J. Lang, making a rare film outing; and established television and pop arrangers Joe Lipman, Don Costa, and Frank Comstock. All the actors did their own singing, except for Marianne McAndrew (Irene Molloy) whose singing was dubbed by Melissa Stafford for Irene's vocal solos and Gilda Maiken for when Irene sings with other characters.

Release

U.S. premieres
The film premiered in New York at Rivoli Theater on December 16, 1969. Production had wrapped more than a year earlier, but release was significantly delayed for contractual reasons. A clause in the 1965 film sale contract specified that the film could not be released until 20 June 1971 or when the show closed on Broadway, whichever came first. In 1969, the show was still running. Eager to release the film to recoup its cost, Fox negotiated and paid an "early release" escape payment to release "Dolly" which cost Fox an estimated $1–2 million. The following day, the film started 45 roadshow engagements around the United States and Canada before opening worldwide on December 18, starting in Belgium, the Netherlands, New Zealand and South Africa.

Critical reception
The film received favorable reviews upon release, but some critics felt it was not a success as a musical, with Kelly and Kidd making little use of the widescreen format of the film. Critic Tom Santopietro described their approach as "shoveling more and more bodies on-screen with no apparent purpose." Vincent Canby in his New York Times review said that the producer and director "merely inflated the faults to elephantine proportions."

In more recent years, Hello, Dolly!'''s critical reputation has cooled considerably; as of June 2022, it holds a 45% "Rotten" rating on review aggregator Rotten Tomatoes based on 31 reviews, with an average rating of 6/10. The consensus states: "Though Barbra Streisand charms, she's miscast as the titular middle-aged widow in Gene Kelly's sluggish and over-produced final directorial effort." Eric Henderson of Slant Magazine said of the film: "More infamous for bringing Fox financially to its knees than for being the last major musical directed by Gene Kelly, Hello, Dolly! is one big-assed bull in a china shop. The film cost nearly as much to produce as Cleopatra and made far less at the box office, thus earning the film its reputation as one of Hollywood’s foremost turkeys."

Box office
The film opened strongly, finishing in third place at the US box office behind On Her Majesty's Secret Service and Easy Rider in its opening week and initially grossed more than The Sound of Music, but lost momentum and became a disappointment at the box office. It grossed $33.2 million at the box office in the United States, earning a theatrical rental (the distributor's share of the box office after deducting the exhibitor's cut) of $15.2 million, ranking it in the top five highest-grossing films of the 1969–1970 season. In total, it earned $26 million in theatrical rentals for Fox, against its $25.335 million production budget. Despite performing well at the box office, it still lost its backers an estimated $10 million.

The soundtrack album's sales also did not live up to expectations, peaking at number 49 on the Billboard chart.

Home mediaHello, Dolly! was one of the first theatrical films to be released on the then-new VHS and Betamax home video formats in the fall of 1978. It was released on DVD in 2003 and Blu-ray in 2013. It began streaming on Disney+ on May 22, 2020.

Awards and honors

Others
The film is recognized by American Film Institute in these lists:
 2004: AFI's 100 Years...100 Songs:
 "Hello, Dolly!" – Nominated
 2006: AFI's Greatest Movie Musicals – Nominated

In other media
 Songs and footage from the scenes "Put on Your Sunday Clothes" and "It Only Takes a Moment", as well as still images from the film in general, were prominently featured in the 2008 Disney-Pixar film, WALL-E. WALL-E watches the footage from an old Betamax, and learns about the concept of love from the film.
 The songs "Elegance" and "Put on Your Sunday Clothes" are heard through any day at the Main Street section of the Magic Kingdom in Walt Disney World, with the addition of "Before the Parade Passes By" at Disneyland in Anaheim.
 The song "Just Leave Everything to Me" is heard in the season 2 opening of The Marvelous Mrs. Maisel''.

See also
 List of American films of 1969
 Hello, Dolly! stage play
 The Matchmaker

References

External links

 
 
 
 
 
 New York Times review
 2003 review of the DVD release
 Barbra Archives DOLLY Pages: Posters & Behind the Scenes, Locations, DOLLY Sights and Sounds 

1969 films
1969 musical comedy films
1969 romantic comedy films
1960s American films
1960s English-language films
1960s historical comedy films
1960s historical musical films
1960s historical romance films
1960s romantic musical films
20th Century Fox films
American historical comedy films
American historical musical films
American historical romance films
American musical comedy films
American romantic comedy films
American romantic musical films
Culture of Yonkers, New York
A Day Well Spent
Films based on adaptations
Films based on musicals
Films based on musicals based on films
Films directed by Gene Kelly
Films produced by Ernest Lehman
Films scored by Lennie Hayton
Films scored by Lionel Newman
Films set on trains
Films set in 1890
Films set in the 1890s
Films set in New York City
Films set in New York (state)
Films set in Westchester County, New York
Films shot in New York City
Films shot in New York (state)
Films that won the Best Original Score Academy Award
Films that won the Best Sound Mixing Academy Award
Films whose art director won the Best Art Direction Academy Award
Films with screenplays by Ernest Lehman